Tandzatap is a village in the Tatev Municipality of the Syunik Province in Armenia.

Demographics

Population 
The Statistical Committee of Armenia reported its population was 100 in 2010, up from 99 at the 2001 census.

Gallery

References 

Populated places in Syunik Province